Flaminio Bertoni (Masnago, Italy, 10 January 1903 – Paris, France, 7 February 1964) was an Italian automobile designer from the years preceding World War II until his death in 1964. Before his work in industrial design, Bertoni was a sculptor.

Working at Citroën for decades, Bertoni designed the Traction Avant (1934), 2CV, the H van, the DS, and the Ami 6. The DS was often exhibited at industrial design showcases, such as the 1957 Milan Triennale Exposition, and inspired French coach builder Henri Chapron, who produced coupé and cabriolet versions of the DS.

The province of Varese dedicated a museum to his memory. It opened in May 2007.

References

External links
 Biography on flaminiobertoni.it
 Expo Bertoni
 Flaminio Bertoni. Life, Genius and Works (documentary – 2007)
 

1903 births
1964 deaths
Italian automobile designers